Semmes is a surname. Notable people with it include:

Albert G. Semmes (1810–1883), American lawyer and politician
Alexander Alderman Semmes (1825–1885), American Civil War Union Navy commodore
Benedict J. Semmes, Jr. (1913–1994), United States Navy admiral
Benedict Joseph Semmes (1789–1863), American politician and Maryland State Senator
Bernard B. Semmes, a mayor of Newport News, Virginia
Paul Jones Semmes (1815–1863), a banker, businessman, and a Confederate General in the American Civil War
Raphael Semmes (1809–1877), an officer in both the U.S. Navy and Confederate Navy
Stephen Semmes, a Professor of Mathematics at Rice University
Thomas J. Semmes (1824–1899), a member of the Louisiana state legislature
T. Semmes Walmsley (1889–1942), Mayor of New Orleans